Dia dos Namorados (Lovers' Day) is a special date celebrated on June 12 in Brazil. The date is celebrated with gifts, romantic activities, decorations and festivities.

The date is June 12 since it is close to Saint Anthony's Day on June 13. The term "Dia dos Namorados" is also used in other Portuguese-speaking countries to refer to Valentine's Day.

Background
Anthony of Padua, known as Saint Anthony, died on June 13, 1231, in Padua, Italy. In addition to having been canonized as a saint by the Catholic Church, Anthony of Padua is recognized as a general in the Brazilian Army. In Brazil, the Dia dos Namorados is celebrated on June 12, which is Saint Anthony's Day Eve. Saint Anthony is recognized for blessing young couples with happy and prosperous marriages. Celebrations for Dia dos Namorados in Brazil and those for Valentine's Day in most other countries are similar. Typically, couples exchange romantic gifts, such as chocolates or flowers, and they may also share a "date night".  Additionally, beautifying home decorations are common as a part of the celebration. The day is festive, with colorful street decorations, parades and carnivals. Common musical celebrations include samba dancing and other folk music celebrations. In 2011, 2012, and 2017 the day was recognized online as the subject of a Google doodle.

Dia dos Namorados as a celebration for lovers is closely related to observances of Saint Anthony's Day.  Although Saint Anthony's Day is celebrated in some countries on January 17 in association with Anthony the Great, Saint Anthony (of Padua)'s Day Eve or Saint Anthony's Day is a day of religious observance for many in Brazil and his homeland of Portugal. Single women perform popular rituals, called simpatias, in order to find a good husband or boyfriend. In addition to prayer on the Eve, one might conceal a love letter in a pot of basil to pass to a prospective suitor.

The February 14 Valentine's Day is not celebrated in Brazil at all because it usually falls close to the Brazilian Carnival, which is celebrated in most other countries annually during the four days before Ash Wednesday, which falls between February 4 and March 10 depending on the year. 

In other Portuguese-speaking countries, Valentine's Day is referred to as "Dia dos Namorados" and celebrated the same day Valentine's Day is celebrated in February.

References

Public holidays in Brazil
Observances in Brazil
Christian festivals and holy days
Days celebrating love
June observances
Saints days

pt:Dia dos Namorados